was a Japanese actor. He appeared in more than 280 films from 1937 to 1972.

Career
Kita started out in the film industry in the scenario department at the Shochiku studios, but moved to Nikkatsu in 1937 and made his acting debut in Tomu Uchida's Kagirinaki zenshin. At Nikkatsu, he both starred in films and played supporting roles. After working at Daiei and going freelance, he returned to Shochiku in 1950 and often played fathers, school principals, and company directors. He appeared in many films directed by Yasujirō Ozu.

Filmography

References

External links 
 
 

1905 births
1972 deaths
Male actors from Tokyo
Japanese male film actors